Australia participated at the 2018 Summer Youth Olympics in Buenos Aires, Argentina from 6 October to 18 October 2018.

Archery

Individual

Team

Athletics

Track

Field

Badminton

Singles

Team

Basketball

Beach volleyball

Australia qualified a boys' and girls' team based on their performance at the 2018 Oceania U19 Championship.

 Boys' tournament - 1 team of 2 athletes
 Girls' tournament - 1 team of 2 athletes

Boxing

Australia selected three athletes to compete based on their performance at the 2018 Youth Oceania Confederation Boxing Championships.

 Boys' -69 kg - Kiwa King
 Boys' +91 kg - Jai Dennis
 Girls' -60 kg - Emma Lawson
Summary

Boys

Girls

Canoeing

Australia qualified one boat based on its performance at the 2018 World Qualification Event.

 Girls' K1 - Jenaya Massie
Summary
Girls

Diving

Matthew Carter competed in the boys' 3m springboard event and Alysha Koloi competed in the girls' 3m springboard event.

Equestrian

Australia qualified a rider based on its ranking in the FEI World Jumping Challenge Rankings.

 Individual Jumping - Madeline Sinderberry
Summary

Fencing

Australia qualified two athletes based on its performance at the 2018 Cadet World Championship.

 Boys' Foil - Robert Ciccarelli
 Girls' Foil - Giorgia Salmas

Golf

Individual

Team

Gymnastics

Artistic
Australia qualified one gymnast based on its performance at the 2018 Oceania Junior Championship.

 Girls' artistic individual all-around - 1 quota

Rhythmic
Australia qualified one gymnast based on its performance at the 2018 Oceania Junior Championship.

 Girls' rhythmic individual all-around - Lidiia Iakovleva

Trampoline
Australia qualified two gymnasts based on its performance at the 2018 Oceania Junior Championship.

 Boys' trampoline - Liam Christie
 Girls' trampoline - Jessica Pickering

Judo

Modern pentathlon

Australia qualified two pentathletes based on its performance at the Asian/Oceanian Youth Olympic Games Qualifier.

 Boys' Individual - Keaan Van Venrooij
 Girls' Individual - Nikita Mawhirt

Roller speed skating

Australia qualified two roller skaters based on its performance at the 2018 Roller Speed Skating World Championship.

 Boys' combined speed event - Alexander Myint
 Girls' combined speed event - Giselle Stogdale

Rowing

Australia qualified one boat based on its performance at the 2017 World Junior Rowing Championships. They would also qualify a girls' single sculls boat at the Oceania Youth Olympic Games Qualification event.

 Boys' single sculls - Cormac Kennedy-Leverett
 Girls' single sculls - Taylor McCarthy-Smith

Sailing

Australia qualified two boats based on its performance at the Oceania Techno 293+ Youth Olympic Games Qualifier. They also qualified another boat at the 2018 World Nacra 15 Championship. A quota in the IKA Twin Tip Racing was achieved at the Asian and Oceania IKA Twin Tip Racing Qualifiers.

 Boys' Techno 293+ - Alex Halank
 Boys' IKA Twin Tip Racing - Mani Bisschops
 Girls' Techno 293+ - Hailey Lea
 Mixed Nacra 15 - Will Cooley & Evie Haseldine

Shooting

Australia qualified three sport shooters based on its performance at the 2017 Oceania Championships.

 Boys' 10m Air Rifle - Alex Hoberg
 Girls' 10m Air Rifle - Victoria Rossiter
 Girls' 10m Air Pistol - Olivia Erickson

Individual

Team

Sport climbing

Australia qualified one sport climber based on its performance at the 2017 Oceania Youth Sport Climbing Championships.

 Boys' combined - Ned Middlehurst

Swimming

Australia selected 8 athletes (4 boys and 4 girls) to compete in swimming.

Boys
Lewis Blackburn
Ashton Brinkworth
Joseph Jackson
Stuart Swinburn

Girls
Chelsea Hodges
Kaylee McKeown
Michaela Ryan
Abbey Webb

Table tennis

Triathlon

Australia qualified two athletes based on its performance at the 2018 Oceania Youth Olympic Games Qualifier.

Individual

Relay

Weightlifting

Boy

Girl

Wrestling

Australia qualified one athlete based on their performance at the 2018 Oceania Cadet Championships.

Key:
  – Without any point scored by the opponent

References

2018 in Australian sport
Nations at the 2018 Summer Youth Olympics
Australia at the Youth Olympics